The Committee on Women's Rights and Gender Equality (FEMM) is a committee of the European Parliament.

Membership

Chair

9th Term

Vice Chairs 
Eugenia Rodríguez Palop
Sylwia Spurek
Elissavet Vozemberg-Vrionidi
Robert Biedroń (president since 2022)

7th Term

Members 
Regina Bastos
Edit Bauer
Godfrey Bloom	 
Emine Bozkurt	 
Andrea Češková 
Marije Cornelissen	 	 
Silvia Costa
Tadeusz Cymański	 	 
Ilda Figueiredo	 	 
Iratxe García	 
Zita Gurmai	 	  	 
Mary Honeyball	 
Sophie in 't Veld	 	 
Teresa Jiménez-Becerril 
Nicole Kiil-Nielsen	 
Rodi Kratsa-Tsagaropoulou
Constance Le Grip
Astrid Lulling	 
Angelika Niebler	 	 
Siiri Oviir	 	 
Antonia Parvanova 	 
Frédérique Ries	 	 
Raül Romeva	 	 
Nikki Sinclaire	 	 
Joanna Skrzydlewska	
Marc Tarabella 
Britta Thomsen	 
Marina Yannakoudakis	 	 
Anna Záborská
Helene Fritzon

Substitutes 
Roberta Angelilli
Izaskun Bilbao Barandica
Vilija Blinkevičiūtė
Franziska Brantner
Anne Delvaux
Cornelia Ernst
Rosa Estaràs
Jill Evans
Mariya Gabriel
Sylvie Guillaume
Kent Johansson
Christa Klaß
Mojca Kleva
Kartika Liotard
Ulrike Lunacek
Gesine Meißner
Morten Messerschmidt
Katarína Neveďalová
Norica Nicolai
Doris Pack
Chrysoúla Saatsóglou-Paliadéli
Antigoni Papadopoulou
Sirpa Pietikäinen
Rovana Plumb
Zuzana Roithová
Licia Ronzulli
Joanna Senyszyn
Eleni Theocharous
Angelika Werthmann
Corien Wortmann-Kool

External links
 Official Homepage

Women
Women's rights in Europe